Thomas Joseph Campbell (March 10, 1922 – March 26, 1996) was a Canadian ice hockey player with the East York Lyndhursts. He captained the team that won a silver medal at the 1954 World Ice Hockey Championships in Stockholm, Sweden. He also played with the Pittsburgh Hornets, Washington Lions, and Hollywood Wolves.

References

1922 births
1996 deaths
Canadian ice hockey defencemen
East York Lyndhursts players